Henry Edmison Duckworth,  (November 1, 1915 – December 18, 2008) was a Canadian physicist and university administrator.

Born in Brandon, Manitoba, and raised in Winnipeg, Duckworth received a Bachelor of Arts degree from Wesley College in 1935, followed by a Bachelor of Science degree in 1936 and a teaching certificate in 1937 from the University of Manitoba. From 1938 to 1940, he taught math and physics at secondary and junior colleges in Manitoba. In 1940, he continued his education, receiving a Ph.D. in Physics from the University of Chicago in 1942.

During World War II, he was a junior scientist with the Royal Canadian Corps of Signals assigned to the National Research Council of Canada.  After the war, he an Assistant Professor of Physics at the University of Manitoba from 1945 to 1946. He then was a Professor of Physics at Wesleyan University from 1946 to 1951. From 1951 to 1965, he was a Professor of Physics at McMaster University. From 1961 to 1965, he was the Dean of Graduate Studies at McMaster University. Among his academic works is Mass Spectroscopy, the first definitive English-language book on the subject.

In 1965, he was appointed Vice-President (Academic) at the University of Manitoba. From 1971 to 1981, he was the second president of the University of Winnipeg. From 1986 to 1992, he was the tenth chancellor of the University of Manitoba.

From 1971 to 1972, he was the president of the Royal Society of Canada. In 2000, he released his memoirs One Version of the Facts: My Life in the Ivory Tower.

In 1976, he was made an Officer of the Order of Canada for "his contributions to physics at university education and his service on numerous scientific and educational bodies".

On December 18, 2008, he died after having suffered a series of strokes that started shortly after his birthday.

References

External links
Obituary from the Canadian Association of Physicists.

1915 births
2008 deaths
Canadian memoirists
Canadian physicists
Canadian university and college chancellors
Fellows of the Royal Society of Canada
Academic staff of McMaster University
Members of the United Church of Canada
Officers of the Order of Canada
People from Brandon, Manitoba
Presidents of the University of Winnipeg
University of Chicago alumni
University of Manitoba alumni
Academic staff of the University of Manitoba
Wesleyan University faculty
20th-century memoirists
Presidents of the Canadian Association of Physicists